Nathan Smith (born 25 December 1985) is a Canadian biathlete.

Career
Smith competed for Canada at the 2014 Winter Olympics.

At the 2015 Biathlon World Championships in Kontiolahti, Finland in the 10 km Sprint event Nathan won Silver. He was the first Canadian male biathlete to medal at a World Championship.

At the 2015 Biathlon World Cup event in Khanty-Mansiysk, Russia Nathan Smith won the first biathlon World Cup gold medal of his career in the Men's 12.5 km pursuit race.

At the Nov. 29, 2015 IBU World Cup in Ostersund, Sweden Canada's Rosanna Crawford and Nathan Smith teamed up to win the silver medal in the season-opening single mixed relay.  The top five results in this race were as follows:  1. Norway, 36:27.3; 2. Canada (Rosanna Crawford/Canmore, Alta., Nathan Smith/Calgary), 36:39.2; 3. Germany, 36:40.5; 4. Sweden, 36:51.7; 5. Russia, 37:09.1

At the 2016 Biathlon World Championships in Holmenkollen, Norway on March 12 Nathan Smith teamed up with Christian Gow, Scott Gow, and Brendan Green to win the bronze medal in the men's relay.

2018 Winter Olympics
In January 2018, Smith was named to Canada's 2018 Olympic team.

Biathlon results
All results are sourced from the International Biathlon Union.

Olympic Games
0 medals

*The mixed relay was added as an event in 2014.

World Championships
2 medals (1 silver, 1 bronze)

*During Olympic seasons competitions are only held for those events not included in the Olympic program.

**The mixed relay was added as an event in 2005.

References

External links
 
 
 

1985 births
Living people
Athletes from Calgary
Canadian male biathletes
Biathletes at the 2014 Winter Olympics
Biathletes at the 2018 Winter Olympics
Olympic biathletes of Canada
Biathlon World Championships medalists